Thatcheria is a genus of sea snails, marine gastropod mollusks in the family Raphitomidae.

Description
(Original description) The solid shell is angularly pyriform. The spire is prominent, shorter than the aperture. It is many-whorled with whorls flattened above, strongly keeled at the periphery and contracted below. The aperture shows a broad incurved sinus between the extremity of the last keel and the junction of the body whorl. The siphonal canal is wide and open. The columella is smooth. The outer lip is simple below the sinus.

Species
Species within the genus Thatcheria include:
 † Thatcheria circumfossa (Koenen, 1872) 
 Thatcheria janae Lorenz & Stahlschmidt, 2019
 † Thatcheria liratula (Powell, 1942) 
 Thatcheria mirabilis Angas, 1877
 † Thatcheria pagodula (Powell, 1942) 
 † Thatcheria waitaraensis (Marwick, 1926)

References

 Marwick, J. (1931). The Tertiary Mollusca of the Gisborne District. New Zealand Geological Survey Paleontological Bulletin 13:1-177. 18: pls.
 Powell, A.W.B. 1966. The molluscan families Speightiidae and Turridae, an evaluation of the valid taxa, both Recent and fossil, with list of characteristic species. Bulletin of the Auckland Institute and Museum. Auckland, New Zealand 5: 1–184, pls 1–23 
 Wilson, B. 1994. Australian marine shells. Prosobranch gastropods. Kallaroo, WA : Odyssey Publishing Vol. 2 370 pp.

External links
 A.J. Charig, The Gastropod Genus Thatcheria and its Relationships; Bulletin of the British Museum (Natural History), vol.  7 # 9 (1963)
 
 Worldwide Mollusc Species Data Base: Raphitomidae

 
Raphitomidae